Comedy Smart is a television channel in Turkey, which broadcasts worldwide hit TV comedy series as Turkish dubbed. It is exclusively available for D-Smart satellite package owners.

Shows
Some of the shows (previously) on Comedy Smart:

10 Items or Less
Absolutely Fabulous
Bakersfield P.D.
Black Books
Carpoolers
Comedy Trap
Coupling
For Your Love
George Lopez
Good Morning Miami
Grounded For Life
Help Me Help You
Jesse
Just Shoot Me!
Keeping Up Appearances
Lalola
Less Than Perfect
Life with Bonnie
Manchild
Miss Guided
My Boys
My Hero
My Wife and Kids
Ned and Stacey
NewsRadio
Off Centre
Off Prime
Open House
Police Academy
Rodney
Scrubs
Sports Night
Stark Raving Mad
That '70s Show
The Naked Truth
The Omid Djalili Show
The War at Home
Titus
Twins
Vienna Calling
Whose Line Is It Anyway?

External links
Comedy Smart
Comedy Smart at LyngSat Address

Television stations in Turkey